Mentha (also known as mint, from Greek  , Linear B mi-ta) is a genus of plants in the family Lamiaceae (mint family). The exact distinction between species is unclear; it is estimated that 13 to 24 species exist. Hybridization occurs naturally where some species' ranges overlap. Many hybrids and cultivars are known.

The genus has a subcosmopolitan distribution across Europe, Africa - (Southern Africa), Asia, Australia - Oceania, North America and South America. Its species can be found in many environments, but most grow best in wet environments and moist soils.

Description

Mints are aromatic, almost exclusively perennial herbs. They have wide-spreading underground and overground stolons and erect, square, branched stems. Mints will grow 10–120 cm (4–48 inches) tall and can spread over an indeterminate area. Due to their tendency to spread unchecked, some mints are considered invasive.

The leaves are arranged in opposite pairs, from oblong to lanceolate, often downy, and with a serrated margin. Leaf colors range from dark green and gray-green to purple, blue, and sometimes pale yellow.

The flowers are produced in long bracts from leaf axils. They are white to purple and produced in false whorls called verticillasters. The corolla is two-lipped with four subequal lobes, the upper lobe usually the largest. The fruit is a nutlet, containing one to four seeds.

Taxonomy 
Mentha is a member of the tribe Mentheae in the subfamily Nepetoideae. The tribe contains about 65 genera, and relationships within it remain obscure. Authors have disagreed on the circumscription of Mentha. For example, M. cervina has been placed in Pulegium and Preslia, and M. cunninghamii has been placed in Micromeria. In 2004, a molecular phylogenetic study indicated that both M. cervina and M. cunninghamii should be included in Mentha. However, M. cunninghamii was excluded in a 2007 treatment of the genus.

More than 3,000 names have been published in the genus Mentha, at ranks from species to forms, the majority of which are regarded as synonyms or illegitimate names. The taxonomy of the genus is made difficult because many species hybridize readily, or are themselves derived from possibly ancient hybridization events. Seeds from hybrids give rise to variable offspring, which may spread through vegetative propagation. The variability has led to what has been described as "paroxysms of species and subspecific taxa"; for example, one taxonomist published 434 new mint taxa for central Europe alone between 1911 and 1916. Recent sources recognize between 18 and 24 species.

Species
, Plants of the World Online recognized the following species:

Mentha alaica Boriss.
Mentha aquatica L. – water mint, marsh mint
Mentha arvensis L. – corn mint, wild mint, Japanese peppermint, field mint, banana mint
Mentha atrolilacina B.J.Conn & D.J.Duval – slender mint
Mentha australis R.Br. – Australian mint
Mentha canadensis L. – Canada mint, American wild mint
Mentha cervina L. – Hart's pennyroyal
Mentha cunninghamii (Benth.) Benth. – New Zealand mint
Mentha dahurica Fisch. ex Benth. – Dahurian thyme
Mentha darvasica Boriss.
Mentha diemenica Spreng. – slender mint
Mentha gattefossei Maire
Mentha grandiflora Benth.
Mentha japonica (Miq.) Makino
Mentha laxiflora Benth. – forest mint
Mentha longifolia (L.) L. – horse mint
Mentha micrantha (Fisch. ex Benth.) Heinr.Braun
Mentha pamiroalaica Boriss.
Mentha pulegium L. – pennyroyal
Mentha requienii Benth. – Corsican mint
Mentha royleana Wall. ex Benth.
Mentha satureioides R.Br. – native pennyroyal
Mentha spicata L. – spearmint, garden mint (a cultivar of spearmint)
Mentha suaveolens Ehrh. – apple mint, pineapple mint (a variegated cultivar of apple mint)

Other species
There are a number of plants that have mint in the Norwegian name in Norway and also the same in other Scandinavian countries here, but which do not belong to the genus Mentha:
 Canada mint (Mentha canadensis)
 Meadow mint (Mentha ×gracilis)
 Meadow mint (Mentha arvensis x spicata)
 Gray mint (Mentha longifolia)
 Peppermint (Mentha ×piperita)
 Polemint (Mentha pulegium)
 Woolly mint (Mentha ×rotundifolia)
 Toothmint (Mentha ×smithiana)
 Mentha × villosa
 Tea mint (Mentha ×verticillata)
 Water mint, Mentha aquatica (water mint; syn. Mentha hirsuta Huds.) (Mentha aquatica)
 Marsh mint
 Field mint (Mentha arvensis)
 Mentha arvensis 'Banana' (Banana Mint)
 Mint genus (Acinos)
 Backlemint (Acinos arvensis)
 Specially minted Selecta mint, (Sideritis)
 Sidermint (Sideritis montana)
 Peppermint (Mentha × piperita) (black and white peppermint)
 Peppermint (Mentha requienii) – Corsican Mint
 Peppermint (Mentha x piperita)
 Chinese Peppermint
 Japanese Peppermint
 Moroccan mint
 Swiss mint
 Chocolate mint (Mentha × piperita)
 Chocolate mint (Mentha 'Chocolate)
 Spearmint (Mentha spicata)
 Green mint (Mentha spicata) 
 Spearmint Mentha spicata Linné
 Sight. M. crispa Wenderoth
 Spearmint Crispa
 Spearmint (Mentha spicata var. 'Crispa)
 Spearmint - Mentha Spicata Crispa. ('Mentha spicata 'Crispa')
 Mentha 'Curly' (Spearmint)
 Spearmint species (Acinos)
 Spearmint (Acinos arvensis)
 Spearmint (Mentha spicata)
 Spearmint (Mentha suaveolens)
 Spearmint (Origanum vulgare)
 Moroccan mint (Mentha spicata 'MOROCCO'), Mint Moroccan (Mentha spicata 'Morocco) Moroccan mint is a mint of spearmint, Mentha spicata var. Crispa. The variety is called 'Moroccan' Mentha spicata var. crispa 'Moroccan'
 Mentha spicata Moroccan wild - Moroccan Mint 32a
 Mentha spicata Moroccan wild - Moroccan Mint Bord 32a
 Bowles mint (Mentha villosa)
 Bowles mint (Mentha × villosa 'Alopecuroides'''')
 Meadow mint (Mentha arvensis x spicata)
 Meadow Mint (Mentha x gracilis)
 Lemon mint (Mentha X gentilis)
 Lemon mint (Mentha x piperita var. citrata)
 Mentha ssp. 'Hilary's Sweet Lemon' (Mentha X gentilis)
 Strawberry mint, Mentha Spicata, Mentha X piperita 'Strawberry' (Strawberry mint) (Mentha species 'Erdbeer')
 Mojito Mint (Mentha Spicata 'Mojito')
 Cuba mint
 Eau de Cologneminten (Mentha × piperita 'Citrata')
 Kiwi mint (Mentha cunninghamii)
 Flea mint (Mentha requienii) 
 Corsican Mint
 Grey mint (Mentha longifolia)
 Mentha pulegium (Mentha pulegium) - (European) pennyroyal, or pennyrile, also called mosquito plant and pudding grass.
 Round leaf mint (Mentha suaveolens) or apple mint, Mentha suaveolens, apple mint, pineapple mint, woolly mint or round leaf mint (synonyms M. rotundifolia, Mentha macrostachya, Mentha insularis).
 Mentha suaveolens, the apple mint, pineapple mint, woolly mint or round-leafed mint (synonyms M. rotundifolia, Mentha macrostachya, Mentha insularis)
 Apple mint (roundleaf mint) (Mentha suaveolens (M. rotundifolia)
 Red stemmed apple mint (Mentha x gracilis) 
 Apple mint (Mentha rotundifolia)
 Apple mint (Mentha suaveolens)
 Applemint (Woolmint)
 Variegated apple mint (Mentha Suaveolens)
 Variegated apple mint (variegated apple mint)
 Variegated Mint variegata (Variegated Mint - Mentha Rotundifolia, "Variegata")
 Variegated mint variegata 450
 Pineapple mint
 Variegated pineapple mint (Mint - Pineapple Mint)
 Ginger mint
 Variegated Ginger Mint
 Pennyroyal
 Red Raripila mint
 Mentha × rotundifolia
 Mentha × rotundifolia (M. longifolia × M. suaveolens)
 Mentha longifolia var. asiatica
 Mentha spicata 'Abura' (Japanese mint) (Japanese medicine mint)
 Spearmint species (Acinos)
 Spearmint (Acinos arvensis)
 Horsemint family (Agastache)
 Korean horsemint (Agastache rugosa)
 Horsemint (Agastache urticifolia)
 Calamintha (Calamintha)
 Rosemary (Calamintha grandiflora)
 Clinopodium (Clinopodium)
 Clinopodium vulgare (Clinopodium vulgare)
 Comb mint family (Elsholtzia)
 Comb mint (Elsholtzia ciliata)
 Borage (Marrubium)
 Borage (Marrubium vulgare)
 Monarda 
 Horsemint (Monarda didyma)
 Monarda fistulosa
 Catnip (Nepeta)
 Catnip (Nepeta cataria)
 Ornamental catmint (Nepeta ×faassenii)
 Large Catnip (Nepeta grandiflora)
 Catnip (Nepeta nuda)
 Catnip (Nepeta racemosa)
 Rock mint family (Origanum)
 Spearmint (Origanum vulgare)
 Greek mountain mint (Origanum vulgare ssp. prismaticum)
 Wild mountain mint or kung (Origanum vulgare ssp. vulgare)
 Sideritis (Sideritis)
 Sideritis montana (Sideritis montana)
 Vietnamese mint, Cambodian mint, hot mint, Persicaria odorata (Polygonaceae)
 Mexican mint marigold, Tagetes lucida (Asteraceae)
 Balm mint (Melissa officinalis) mint family
 Balm mint (Melittis melissophyllum)
 Richweed, or horse balm mint (Collinsonia canadensis)
 Field balm, or creeping Charlie mint (Glechoma hederacea)
 Lesser calamint, or field balm mint (Clinopodium nepeta)
 Lemon balm mint
 Catnip (Nepeta cataria)
 Mentha canadensis
 Mentha haplocalyx
 Mentha canadensis
 Mentha cervina
 Mentha japonica
 Mentha alopecuroides
 Mentha nemorosa
 Mentha asiatica 
 Mentha vagans

 Hybrids 

The mint genus has a large grouping of recognized hybrids. Those accepted by Plants of the World Online are listed below. Parent species are taken from Tucker & Naczi (2007). Synonyms, along with cultivars and varieties where available, are included within the specific nothospecies.

Mentha × carinthiaca Host (M. arvensis × M. suaveolens)
Mentha × dalmatica Tausch (M. arvensis × M. longifolia)
Mentha × dumetorum Schult. (M. aquatica × M. longifolia)
Mentha × gayeri Trautm.
Mentha × gracilis Sole (syn. Mentha × gentilis L.; M. arvensis × M. spicata) – ginger mint, Scotch spearmint
Mentha × kuemmerlei Trautm.
Mentha × locyana Borbás
Mentha × piperita L. (M. aquatica × M. spicata) – peppermint, chocolate mint
Mentha × pyramidalis Ten.
Mentha × rotundifolia (L.) Huds. (M. longifolia × M. suaveolens) – false apple mint
Mentha × suavis Guss. (syn. Mentha × maximilianea; M. aquatica × M. suaveolens)
Mentha × verticillata L. (M. aquatica × M. arvensis)
Mentha × villosa Huds. (M. spicata × M. suaveolens, also called M. nemorosa) – large apple mint, foxtail mint, hairy mint, woolly mint, Cuban mint, mojito mint, and yerba buena in Cuba
Mentha × villosa-nervata Opiz (M. longifolia × M. spicata) – sharp-toothed mint
Mentha × wirtgeniana F.W.Schultz (syn. Mentha × smithiana; M. aquatica × M. arvensis × M. spicata) – red raripila mint
Mentha × amblardii Debeaux (syn. Mentha × suavis)Mentha × lamiifolia Ten (syn. Mentha × suavis)Mentha × langii Steud. ex Hagenb (syn. Mentha × suavis)Mentha × mauponii Gadeceau (syn. Mentha × suavis)Mentha × maximilianea F.W.Schultz (syn. Mentha × suavis)Mentha × maximilianea subsp. baileyi Briq (syn. Mentha × suavis)Mentha × rodriguezii Malinv (syn. Mentha × suavis)Mentha × weissenburgensis F.W.Schultz (syn. Mentha × suavis)Mentha × maximilianea F.W.Schultz, F.W.Schultz Flora, Schultz, F. [116], France, Schultz, F. [115], France, Boutigny, J.F.D. [s.n.], France, Boutigny, J.F.D. [338], France (syn. Mentha × suavis)

 Cultivation 

All mints thrive near pools of water, lakes, rivers, and cool moist spots in partial shade. In general, mints tolerate a wide range of conditions, and can also be grown in full sun. Mint grows all year round.

They are fast-growing, extending their reach along surfaces through a network of runners. Due to their speedy growth, one plant of each desired mint, along with a little care, will provide more than enough mint for home use. Some mint species are more invasive than others. Even with the less invasive mints, care should be taken when mixing any mint with any other plants, lest the mint take over. To control mints in an open environment, they should be planted in deep, bottomless containers sunk in the ground, or planted above ground in tubs and barrels.

Some mints can be propagated by seed, but growth from seed can be an unreliable method for raising mint for two reasons: mint seeds are highly variable — one might not end up with what one supposed was planted — and some mint varieties are sterile. It is more effective to take and plant cuttings from the runners of healthy mints.

The most common and popular mints for commercial cultivation are peppermint (Mentha × piperita), native spearmint (Mentha spicata), Scotch spearmint (Mentha x gracilis), and cornmint (Mentha arvensis); also (more recently) apple mint (Mentha suaveolens).

Mints are supposed to make good companion plants, repelling pesty insects and attracting beneficial ones. They are susceptible to whitefly and aphids.

Harvesting of mint leaves can be done at any time. Fresh leaves should be used immediately or stored up to a few days in plastic bags in a refrigerator. Optionally, leaves can be frozen in ice cube trays. Dried mint leaves should be stored in an airtight container placed in a cool, dark, dry area.

Uses

Culinary

The leaf, fresh or dried, is the culinary source of mint. Fresh mint is usually preferred over dried mint when storage of the mint is not a problem. The leaves have a warm, fresh, aromatic, sweet flavor with a cool aftertaste, and are used in teas, beverages, jellies, syrups, candies, and ice creams. In Middle Eastern cuisine, mint is used in lamb dishes, while in British cuisine and American cuisine, mint sauce and mint jelly are used, respectively. Mint (pudina) is a staple in Indian cuisine, used for flavouring curries and other dishes.

Mint is a necessary ingredient in Touareg tea, a popular tea in northern African and Arab countries. Tea in Arab countries is popularly drunk this way. Alcoholic drinks sometimes feature mint for flavor or garnish, such as the mint julep and the mojito. Crème de menthe is a mint-flavored liqueur used in drinks such as the grasshopper.

Mint essential oil and menthol are extensively used as flavorings in breath fresheners, drinks, antiseptic mouth rinses, toothpaste, chewing gum, desserts, and candies, such as mint (candy) and mint chocolate. The substances that give the mints their characteristic aromas and flavors are menthol (the main aroma of peppermint and Japanese peppermint) and pulegone (in pennyroyal and Corsican mint). The compound primarily responsible for the aroma and flavor of spearmint is L-carvone.

Mints are used as food plants by the larvae of some Lepidoptera species, including buff ermine moths. It is also eaten by beetles such as Chrysolina coerulans (blue mint beetle) and Mint leaf beetle.

Traditional medicine and cosmetics
The ancient Greeks rubbed mint on their arms, believing it would make them stronger. Mint was originally used as a medicinal herb to treat stomach ache and chest pains. There are several uses in traditional medicine and preliminary research for possible use in treating irritable bowel syndrome.

Menthol from mint essential oil (40–90%) is an ingredient of many cosmetics and some perfumes. Menthol and mint essential oil are also used in aromatherapy which may have clinical use to alleviate post-surgery nausea.

Allergic reaction
Although it is used in many consumer products, mint may cause allergic reactions in some people, inducing symptoms such as abdominal cramps, diarrhea, headaches, heartburn, tingling or numbing around the mouth, anaphylaxis or contact dermatitis.

Insecticides
Mint oil is also used as an environmentally friendly insecticide for its ability to kill some common pests such as wasps, hornets, ants, and cockroaches.

Room scent and aromatherapy
Known in Greek mythology as the herb of hospitality, one of mint's first known uses in Europe was as a room deodorizer. The herb was strewn across floors to cover the smell of the hard-packed soil. Stepping on the mint helped to spread its scent through the room. Today, it is more commonly used for aromatherapy through the use of essential oils.

 Diseases 

 Etymology of "mint" 

The word "mint" descends from the Latin word mentha or menta, which is rooted in the Greek words  mintha,  minthē or  mintē meaning "spearmint". The plant was personified in Greek mythology as Minthe, a nymph who was beloved by Hades and was transformed into a mint plant by either Persephone or Demeter. This, in turn, ultimately derived from a proto-Indo-European root that is also the origin of the Sanskrit -mantha, mathana (premna serratifolia).

References to "mint leaves", without a qualifier like "peppermint" or "apple mint", generally refer to spearmint leaves.

In Spain and Central and South America, mint is known as menta. In Lusophone countries, especially in Portugal, mint species are popularly known as hortelã.

The taxonomic family Lamiaceae is known as the mint family. It includes many other aromatic herbs, including most of the more common cooking herbs, such as basil, rosemary, sage, oregano, and catnip.

As an English colloquial term, any small mint-flavored confectionery item can be called a mint.

In common usage, other plants with fragrant leaves may be called "mint", although they are not in the mint family:
 Vietnamese mint, commonly used in Southeast Asian cuisine is Persicaria odorata in the family Polygonaceae, collectively known as smartweeds or pinkweeds.
 Mexican mint marigold is Tagetes lucida in the sunflower family (Asteraceae).

Fossil record
†Mentha pliocenica' fossil seeds have been excavated in Pliocene deposits of Dvorets on the right bank of the Dnieper river between the cities of Rechitsa and Loyew, in south-eastern Belarus. The fossil seeds are similar to the seeds of Mentha aquatica and Mentha arvensis''.

References

External links 

 Flora Europaea: Mentha
 Botanical.com entry on Mint
 
 Preview of Mint: The Genus Mentha

Herbs
Indian spices
Lamiaceae genera
Medicinal plants
 
Stoloniferous plants
Taxa named by Carl Linnaeus